PS Decoy is a privately owned paddle steamer, believed to be the only sea-going paddle steamer in the Southern Hemisphere. Built in 1986 in Fremantle, Decoy is a replica of the original paddle steamer that operated on the Swan River in the 1870s. She was used in the filming of the television mini-series Cloudstreet, which was based on Tim Winton's novel.

History 
Decoy was built by Australian Ship Building Industries in Fremantle in 1986, a replica of the original paddle steamer that operated on the Swan River in the 1870s. Chas Cox purchased Decoy in 1990s and upgraded the vessel.

Engines 
Decoy is powered by a 1905 Ransome Sims and Jefferies twin cylinder steam engine, which was salvaged and restored from Bunnings engineering workshops in Manjimup. The engine was totally rebuilt in 1986 with a new oil fired burner and maxitherm boiler fitted.

Service 
As of 2011 Decoy is used mainly for weddings and corporate events, operating on the Swan River.

References 

Paddle steamers
Swan River (Western Australia)
1986 ships